Dora-sani-padu is a small village near Dwaraka Tirumala in India.  Dorasanipadu is located in West Godavari  district of Andhra Pradesh. The nearest railway station is at Eluru located at a distance of more than 10 km.

Demographics 

 Census of India, Dorasinapadu had a population of 3059. The total population constitute, 1565 males and 1494 females with a sex ratio of 955 females per 1000 males. 373 children are in the age group of 0–6 years, with sex ratio of 953. The average literacy rate stands at 66.05%.

References 

Villages in West Godavari district